Saint Gregory the Illuminator Church, commonly referred to as the Armenian Church of Baku (Bak’vi haykakan yekeghetsi), is a former Armenian Apostolic church near Fountains Square in central Baku, Azerbaijan. Completed in 1869 it was one of the two Armenian churches in Baku to survive the Soviet anti-religious campaign and the Nagorno-Karabakh conflict and the 1990 pogrom and expulsion of Baku Armenians when it was looted. It is now the only standing Armenian monument in Baku.

Early history
The church was built between 1863 and 1869 by the design of Karl Hippius, a Baltic German architect. The cornerstone was consecrated by vardapet Daniel Shahnazariants, the bishop of the diocese of Shamakhi, in June 1863. The construction was funded by Javad Melikiants (Melikov), a Baku-based Armenian philanthropist and founder of the city's first paraffin plant. The church was consecrated on May 4, 1869, by archbishop Andreas Andreasian. The Armenian Philanthropic Society of Baku founded a girls' school in 1866 and a library in 1870 next to the church.

In 1903 the Russian government's decision to confiscate the properties of the Armenian church were widely opposed by Armenians. The church was the site of a clash between Russian Cossack soldiers and Armenian nationalist activists on September 2, 1903. A group of armed activists affiliated with the Armenian Revolutionary Federation (Dashnaks), led by Nikol Duman defended the church. The confrontation turned violent by night and resulted in 11 deaths and 45 injuries on the Armenian side.

On September 15, 1918, the church was attacked and looted by the invading Ottoman forces in the aftermath of the Battle of Baku. On June 11, 1919, Ottoman-Azerbaijani forces sieged the church and conducted a search. After not finding any arms inside, the soldiers shot at the walls of the church.

In 1920 it became the cathedral of the Armenian Apostolic Diocese of Azerbaijan and Turkmenistan. It survived through the Soviet state atheist policies of the 1920s and 1930s when all but two Armenian churches in Baku were destroyed. The church was reopened in 1945 and became the seat of the diocese of Azerbaijan. In the 1950s, the church underwest restoration and by 1956 five priests and ministers served at the cathedral. It had a choir, which was composed of 25 people in 1970, when they visited Etchmiadzin.

1990 pogrom and aftermath
The large Armenian population of Baku—around 200,000 in the mid-1980s—was targeted in a January 1990 pogrom during the Nagorno-Karabakh conflict. The city's Armenian population was forced to flee. Serious damage to the church was caused by an arson attack on December 25, 1989, but it remained standing. Vazgen I, head of the Armenian Church, wrote to Yuri Khristoradnov, the chairman of the Soviet Council for Religious Affairs, in January 1990 that "extremist Azeri nationalists set fire to the Armenian Church in Baku on 25 December [1989], destroying valuable ecclesiastical books, holy paintings, and all ecclesiastical clothing."

Bill Keller wrote in The New York Times in February 1990 that the church "whose congregation has been depleted over the past two years by an emigration based on fear, is now a charred ruin. A neighbor said firefighters and the police watched without intervening as vandals destroyed the building at the beginning of the year." Human Rights Watch wrote in 1995: "Armenians have vanished from the streets of Baku [...] the Armenian church in Baku stand[s] empty."

Current state
An August 2, 2001 decree of the cabinet of Azerbaijan listed the church as an historical and cultural monument of national importance.

Thomas de Waal wrote in his 2003 book Black Garden that the church "remains a gutted shell eleven years after it was burned in December 1989; the cross has been removed from the belfry, now used as a pool hall." He also wrote that it remains the only visible Armenian monument in Baku. Jason Thomson wrote in 2005 that it was "transformed into a billiard hall and tea house." The library of the church consisting of 5,000 books and manuscripts has been preserved.

In 2002 the church was transferred to the Presidential Library, which is located nearby, and now houses its archive. In 2006 Azerbaijani Minister of Culture Abulfas Garayev stated that converting the church into a library is purposeful because there are not many Armenian Christians in Azerbaijan. Emil Sanamyan, fellow at the USC Institute of Armenian Studies, argues that calling it a "presidential book depository" is more accurate as "library implies public access which there isn't in this case." According to Samir Huseynov it is open to PhD students and other researchers who can get access.

The Azerbaijani authorities have presented the church as proof of their tolerance of minorities, especially the Armenians. In a 2021 interview, Azerbaijani president Ilham Aliyev claimed the church was repaired. "It is in the center of the city, and if anyone goes there, they will see that there are about 5,000 Armenian books there," he told CNN Türk.

Visits by Armenians
In April 2010 Catholicos Karekin II, the head of the Armenian Apostolic Church, visited the church and prayed and sang medieval hymns there. He expressed hope that the church will eventually "reopen its doors to believers." It was the first time since 1990 that prayer was heard at the church.

In April 2012 the Armenian delegation participating at a Euronest Parliamentary Assembly meeting in Baku visited the church. In their visit in September 2017 the Armenian delegates found the church and its grounds closed.

Gallery

See also
 Church of the Holy Virgin, a small Armenian church in Baku's Old City. Built in the 1700s and destroyed in 1992.

References
notes

references

Bibliography
 
 

Religious organizations established in 1887
Armenian Apostolic churches
Armenian churches in Azerbaijan
Former churches
Former religious buildings and structures in Azerbaijan
Oriental Orthodox congregations established in the 19th century
Religious organizations disestablished in 1989
19th-century Oriental Orthodox church buildings
Churches in Baku
1869 establishments in the Russian Empire
1989 disestablishments in Azerbaijan
Churches completed in 1869
Karl Hippius buildings and structures